The Tempest (Russian: Буря Burya), Symphonic Fantasia after Shakespeare, Op. 18, is a symphonic poem in F minor by Pyotr Ilyich Tchaikovsky composed in 1873. It was premiered in December 1873, conducted by Nikolai Rubinstein.

It is based on the play The Tempest by William Shakespeare.  Similar in structure to Tchaikovsky's better-known Romeo and Juliet fantasy-overture, it contains themes depicting the stillness of the ship at sea, the grotesque nature of Caliban, and the love between Ferdinand and Miranda.  The love music is particularly strong, being reminiscent of the love music from Romeo and Juliet.

Tchaikovsky was much influenced by Shakespeare: in addition to Romeo and Juliet and The Tempest, he also wrote a Hamlet overture-fantasy (1888) and incidental music to Hamlet (1891).

Excerpts from the score were used in the 2005 ballet Anna Karenina, choreographed by Boris Eifman.

Instrumentation
Piccolo, 2 Flutes, 2 Oboes, 2 Clarinets (B♭), 2 Bassoons + 4 Horns (F), 2 Trumpets (F), 3 Trombones, Tuba + Timpani, Cymbals, Bass Drum + Violins I, Violins II, Violas, Cellos, Double Basses

References

External links
Tchaikovsky Research
Sheet music
Full Score

Compositions by Pyotr Ilyich Tchaikovsky
Symphonic poems by Pyotr Ilyich Tchaikovsky
Works based on The Tempest
1873 compositions
Compositions in F minor
Tchaikovsky
Music based on works by William Shakespeare